In re Exchange Banking Company or Flitcroft's case (1882) LR 21 Ch D 519  is a UK company law case concerning the payment of dividends. It was decided when the law required that dividends should only be paid out of a company's profits, although the courts deferred to company directors to define their own rules for determining when that was so.

Facts
The directors of the Exchange Banking Company had presented account reports before shareholder meetings, which were untrue. Between 1873 and 1878 they paid half yearly dividends totalling £3,192, when they knew items in the accounts were bad debts, irrecoverable and consequently there were no distributable profits. The shareholders acted on the reports and declared dividends. The liquidator issued a summons against five former directors, Flitcroft, Simpson, Grundy, Bardsley and Ramwell, alleging joint and several, or partial, liability, depending on the periods when they had been in office.

Judgment

High Court
James Bacon VC found that the directors were liable to repay the unlawful dividends.

Court of Appeal
Lord Jessel MR agreed the directors must repay the money. Capital invested by shareholders (at this time the aggregate of the nominal share value, not including share premiums, as legal capital is defined under Companies Act 2006) could not be returned to them, and dividends should be paid out of profits only. He said the following.

See also

UK company law

References

United Kingdom company case law
1882 in case law
1882 in British law
Court of Appeal (England and Wales) cases